A Fly is an opening on the crotch area of trousers, closed by a zip or buttons. On men's garments the fly always opens to the right. On women's garments it may open either to the left or to the right.

Trousers have varied historically in whether or not they have flies. Originally, trousers did not have flies or other openings, being pulled down for sanitary functions. The use of a codpiece, a separate covering attached to the trousers, became popular in 16th-century Europe, eventually evolving into an attached fall-front (or broad fall).  The fly-front (split fall) emerged later.

References

Textile closures